The Funk Hunters are a Canadian electronic music act and DJ duo based in Vancouver, British Columbia. Composed of members Nick Middleton and Duncan Smith, The Funk Hunters are recognized on the international dance scene for their future funk sound, which is a mix of old school soul, disco, funk and classic hip hop, deeply cross-pollinated with contemporary electronic dance music. 
 
Nick Middleton is a music producer and record label owner and Duncan Smith is a multimedia artist. Together as The Funk Hunters Middleton and Smith tour the world performing a live audio visual show operated simultaneously from four turntables and two mixers.

Since the pandemic hit in March 2020, the Funk Hunters (Duncan Smith) have hosted a highly popular live stream channel on Twitch, with Detour Drive on Tuesday nights.

History 
Middleton and Smith met in 2008 while working at the Gulf Islands Film and Television School (GIFTS), a media school located on Galiano Island in the coastal community of British Columbia. The two bonded over their mutual appreciation for both funk and electronic dance music (EDM). Inspired by this musical connection they soon invested in a pair of turntables and began DJing as a duo at local island house parties.

Middleton also credits the duo's Gulf Island lifestyle as a big factor in the development of their sound, citing that the rural environment allowed for a freer and broader musical scope while playing for diverse audiences that spanned a few generations.

Another influence in The Funk Hunters' development was the annual Shambhala Music Festival in the West Kootenays region of southern British Columbia. Middleton first attended the festival in its formative years and soon began bringing Smith along with him. Shambhala was Smith and Middleton's first grand exposure to live presentations of electronic bass music, and after only a few short years they themselves have since become Shambhala audience favorites.

Since 2009 The Funk Hunters have become highly popular on the west coast bass music circuit, performing regularly at Shambhala Music Festival, Bass Coast, The Atmosphere Gathering, Tall Tree Festival and the Squamish Valley Music Festival. As their reputation grew, The Funk Hunters began touring nationally and then internationally, performing in the United States, across Europe, Brazil, Central America, and throughout Australia and New Zealand.

Live performance and production  
As the duo began to work professionally, production tasks were divided up with Middleton handling music production responsibilities, and Smith handling the complex visual programming that accompanies their live performances.

When performing live as a DJ duo, Middleton and Smith work with two mixers and four turntables (Technics 1200s), two DJ mixers (Pioneer 900 and Rane 62), a Roland HD Video mixer, and Serato Video software to simultaneously control the visual projection that accompany The Funk Hunters music.

With production facilities in Vancouver, BC, The Funk Hunters work on a variety of projects when off the road. They create unique bootleg remixes of well-known songs by artists like The Who, Red Hot Chili Peppers and Fleetwood Mac. Middleton also produces original Funk Hunters remixes, reworking tracks for artists including Dub FX (Don't Give Up), Imagine Dragons (Shots) and Selena Gomez (Good For You). Middleton works entirely "in the box" producing in Ableton Live and mixing using UAD software emulations - he is sponsored by HHB Canada and Universal Audio.

Since late 2014, longtime friend and collaborator Peter Bowles, who started playing keys in The Funk Hunters live shows, began working with Middleton in the studio co-writing some of the Funk Hunters material with Middleton. The songwriting on most original songs and official remixes released since 2014 are now credited to both Middleton and Bowles*. Middleton continues to oversee all music production and mixing duties and is still publicly credited as the producer, mixer, and sometimes mastering engineer for The Funk Hunters music.

The Funk Hunters band 
The Funk Hunters also began to incorporate musicians into some of their live performances. They first recruited Vancouver DJ and saxophonist DJ Smoothie to tour on a variety of Canadian dates, and over time they have collaborated with a host of Vancouver musicians. Expanding The Funk Hunters ranks has given Middleton and Smith the option to either work strictly as a duo, or with a flexible configuration of live musicians and vocalists including Peter Bowles (Keyboards), Steven Beddall (Guitar), Cole Graham (Trumpet), Chris Wilson (Saxophone), Tonye Aganaba (Vocals), Wintergreen Berry (mod) and Chali 2na (Vocals).

After many years of touring with select musicians at festivals in Canada and the USA, the duo performed their first Live Band show in 2014 at the Commodore Ballroom in Vancouver, and have since gone on to bring the full band configuration to other west coast festivals and venues including Tall Tree Festival, Atmosphere Gathering, Sugar Night Club, Celebrities Nightclub, Rifflandia Festival, and the Philips Weekender.

Collaboration with Chali 2na 

In 2013 while The Funk Hunters were collaborating on a song with German production duo CMC & Silenta the producers unanimously agreed that if they had their choice they would want Charles Stewart, Los Angeles hip hop MC Chali 2na of Jurassic 5, to provide the vocal for the new composition.

Prior to contacting Chali 2na's management the producers searched out a Chali 2na a cappella and added his existing vocal from the 2009 song Lock Shit Down to their completed instrumental so that 2na could conceptualize what his voice would sound like with their music.

Chali 2na and his management were very enthusiastic about the idea of collaborating with The Funk Hunters. Unfortunately, at that time the MC was busy preparing for a forthcoming Jurassic 5 reunion. As an alternative to recording a new vocal for the song Chali 2na granted the producers permission to release the track as is, with 2na's original added a cappella vocal.

Officially sanctioned by the MC, Do This For You by The Funk Hunters and CMC & Silenta featuring Chali 2na was released September 22, 2014 on Westwood Recordings. The song was named "Tune Of The Month" by Mixmag in their September 2014 issue and charted multiple times in the Beatport Top 10 Glitch Hop charts.

Since releasing Do This For You The Funk Hunters and Chali 2na have performed live together throughout the world, the iconic rapper himself referring to Middleton and Smith as"the selectahs of the century."

Westwood Recordings 

In 2013 Nick Middleton decided to start his own record label. To promote the work of other artists, and to streamline The Funk Hunters business, Middleton created Westwood Recordings as the team's main center of operations.

Middleton told Label Engine in January 2016 that "I wanted to start the label early while I was still growing as an artist, as I felt like each business would grow side by side (Westwood and The Funk Hunters), and they could kind of help pull each other along, while at the same time helping to boost all the other music I would be releasing from friends on the label too."

Westwood Recordings have released music by several international artists. In an interview in July 2015 with Vancity, Buzz Middleton said "now (Westwood is) home to friends all over the globe. There are artists from Europe, Australia, New Zealand, and Canada."

Westwood's roster of signed artists includes Calgary, Alberta DJ/producer Defunk, German duo CMC & Silenta, Australia's Crazy Daylight, New Zealand's K+Lab, Canadian psychedelic glitch musician Vespers, Halifax duo PINEO & LOEB, and Vancouver global groove band Delhi 2 Dublin.

Collaboration with Delhi 2 Dublin 

In late 2014 members of Delhi 2 Dublin approached Nick Middleton about producing what would become their 2015 release We're All Desi. The Funk Hunters had known the members of Delhi 2 Dublin for several years and had remixed the title track of the band's 2012 release Turn Up The Stereo for the 2014 full remix version of the album Turn Up The Stereo: Remixed.

We're All Desi was Middleton's first full length production. Middleton also mixed the recording. The Funk Hunters are credited as collaborators on a number of tracks on the recording. Delhi 2 Dublin's We're All Desi was released by Middleton's Westwood Recordings on September 18, 2015.

Recent activity 
In November 2015 Washington DC's Fort Knox Five released The Funk Hunters Remix of their single Whatcha Gonna Do on Fort Knox Records.

December 2015 saw The Funk Hunters embark on a short tour of western Canada culminating in two sold out Christmas shows called Funk The Halls held December 22 and 23 at Vancouver's Commodore Ballroom.

Beginning early January 2016 Middleton and Smith once again joined forces with hip hop MC Chali 2na for an extensive tour of Europe as well as performance dates in Australia, New Zealand and the United States throughout February and March 2016.

Discography

2018 
 Turn Down the Silence - The Funk Hunters feat. DiRTY RADiO, released on Westwood Recordings

2017 
 Say Something - The Funk Hunters feat. Liinks, released on Westwood Recordings 
 Hands Up (Raise Your Fist) - The Funk Hunters feat. Leo Napier, released on Westwood Recordings 
 Got the Love (The Funk Hunters Remix) - Big Gigantic, released on Big Gigantic 
 Satoshi Nakamoto (The Funk Hunters Remix) - Gramatik, released on Lowtemp

2016 
 Illectric EP - Chali 2na & The Funk Hunters, released on Westwood Recordings

2015 
 Shots (The Funk Hunters Remix) - Imagine Dragons, Released on Interscope Records and KIDinaKORNER
 Good For You (The Funk Hunters Remix) - Selena Gomez, self-released with permission from Interscope Records
 Whatcha Gonna Do (The Funk Hunters Remix) - Fort Knox Five, Released on Fort Knox Recordings
 Don't Give Up (The Funk Hunters Remix) - Dub FX, Released on Westwood Recordings
 Fools Gold feat. The Funk Hunters - Delhi 2 Dublin, Released on Westwood Recordings
 Strumph feat. The Funk Hunters - Delhi 2 Dublin, Released on Westwood Recordings
 Digging For Fire (The Funk Hunters Remix) - Kingfisha, Released on Westwood Recordings

2014 
 On Your Side (The Funk Hunters Remix) - Opiuo, Released on Slurp Music
 Do This For You feat. Chali 2na - The Funk Hunters and CMC & Silenta, Released on Westwood Recordings
 Shock Rollin feat. See-I - The Funk Hunters and CMC & Silenta, Released on Westwood Recordings
 Nasty - The Funk Hunters and DJ Wood, Released on ReSoul Records
 Turn Up The Stereo (The Funk Hunters Remix) - Delhi 2 Dublin, Released on Delhi 2 Dublin Music

2013 
 Keep On Moving - The Funk Hunters and SkiiTour, Released on Simplify Recordings
 Lunar Smack - The Funk Hunters and Moontricks, Released on Adapted Records
 Soul Beat feat. Erica Dee and Honey Larochelle - The Funk Hunters and CMC & Silenta, Released on Westwood Recordings
 Is It True (The Funk Hunters Remix) - CMC & Silenta, Released on Roca Records
 Soul Hit Man (The Funk Hunters Remix) - See-I, Released on Fort Knox Recordings
 Dynomite - The Funk Hunters and Timothy Wisdom, Released on Manmade Records
 Keep My Eyes Shut (The Funk Hunters Remix) - This Sound Will Save You, Released on Popguru Sound & Vision
 The Plan - The Funk Hunters vs L&C, Released on ReSoul Records
 Whole Lotta Drop - The Funk Hunters vs L&C, Released on ReSoul Records

2012 
 Lets Get Ill (The Funk Hunters Remix) - Jantsen, Released on True Movement
 Wild For The Night - The Funk Hunters and DJ Wood, Released on ReSoul Records
 Ghetto Disco - The Funk Hunters and Timothy Wisdom, Released on ReSoul Records
 The Ritz - The Funk Hunters vs L&C, Released on ReSoul Records
 Slippery Addict - The Funk Hunters vs L&C, Released on ReSoul Records
 Fly Robin - The Funk Hunters vs L&C, Released on ReSoul Records
 Dance Up The Lion - The Funk Hunters vs L&C, Released on ReSoul Records

Touring 
The Funk Hunters have performed in Canada, Australia, New Zealand, USA, United Kingdom, Ireland, Scotland, Netherlands, Germany, France, Switzerland, Austria, Croatia, Czech Republic, Hungary, Bosnia, Romania, Brazil, Costa Rica, and Nicaragua.

References

External links 
 

Canadian DJs
Canadian musical duos
Musical groups from Vancouver
Musical groups established in 2009
Canadian electronic music groups
Electronic dance music DJs